Dog Days is a 2001 Austrian feature film directed by Ulrich Seidl. The film stars a mix of professional and amateur actors and follows six interwoven stories set in suburban Vienna over the course of some unseasonably hot summer days. The film premiered at the 2001 Venice Film Festival where it went on to win the Grand Special Jury Prize and also won awards at the International Film Festival Bratislava and the Gijon International Film Festival.

Plot
The film is set in Vienna during a week of unseasonably hot summer weather and has six interconnected narrative streams. An alarm systems engineer attempts to capture someone damaging cars, an old man interacts with various people including his housekeeper, a young man treats his girlfriend badly, a teacher has a date with her lover which goes wrong, a divorced couple are dealing with the death of their child and a mentally disturbed hitchhiker asks her drivers rude questions.

Cast
 The hitchhiker – Maria Hofstätter
 The old man – Erich Finsches
 The old man's housekeeper – Gerti Lehner
 The young woman – Franziska Weisz
 The young woman's boyfriend – Rene Wanko
 The ex-husband – Victor Rathbone
 The ex-husband's wife – Claudia Martini
 The teacher – Christine Jirku
 The lover – Viktor Hennemann
 The alarm systems engineer – Alfred Mrva

Production

Ulrich Seidl made the film over three years, recruiting most of the cast as non-professional actors. Alfred Mrva plays the role of an alarm systems engineer whilst being an alarm systems engineer in real life and Viktor Hennemann who plays a lover in the film runs a swingers club.

Critical response
The Guardian review gave the film three stars out of five and called it a "disturbing vision of Viennese suburbanites suffocating in sweltering heat". The BBC reviewer discussed the torture scene and declared "Seidl himself relishes portraying this unpleasantness", whilst Screen Daily stated "Dog Days announces the arrival of a visionary, uncompromising director".

Accolades
The film premiered at and won the Grand Special Jury Prize at the Venice Film Festival in 2001. It also received the FIPRESCI prize at the 2001 International Film Festival Bratislava. Maria Hofstätter was awarded best actress at the 2001 Gijon International Film Festival.

References

External links
 Dog Days at the Internet Movie Database
 Dog Days at Rotten Tomatoes
 

2001 films
Venice Grand Jury Prize winners
2000s German-language films
Films directed by Ulrich Seidl
2000s erotic drama films
Austrian drama films
2001 drama films